Admiral Green may refer to:

Alan Green (admiral) (born 1952), South African Navy rear admiral
Collin P. Green (born 1962), U.S. Navy vice admiral
Eric Green (admiral) (died 2014), South African Navy rear admiral
John Green (Royal Navy officer) (1866–1948), British Royal Navy admiral

See also
Philip H. Greene Jr. (fl. 1970s–2010s), U.S. Navy rear admiral
Theodore P. Greene (1809–1887), U.S. Navy rear admiral